Groß Schacksdorf-Simmersdorf (Lower Sorbian: Tšěšojce-Žymjerojce) is a municipality in the district of Spree-Neiße, in Lower Lusatia, Brandenburg, Germany.

History
From 1815 to 1947, the constituent localities of Groß Schacksdorf-Simmersdorf were part of the Prussian Province of Brandenburg. From 1952 to 1990, they were part of the Bezirk Cottbus of East Germany. On 31 December 2001, the municipality of Groß Schacksdorf-Simmersdorf was formed by merging the municipalities of Groß Schacksdorf and Simmersdorf.

Demography

People 
 Heinrich Sigismund von der Heyde (1703-1765), Prussian general

References

Populated places in Spree-Neiße